William IV (c. 1030 – 1100) was the fifth Marquis of Montferrat from 1084.

The date of William's birth is unknown, but it most likely took place between 1030 and 1035. He was the eldest son of Otto II and Constance of Savoy.

Life 
He first appears in a document of 1059, when he is placed in power over the city of Savona, probably as per a request of the citizenry for a ruler of their own.

He was present when the Emperor Henry IV donated the monastery of Breme to the church of Pavia.

This section needs translation into English. 

In an act dated 15 September 1096, Uvilielmus marchio filius quondam Uvilielmi et Ota iugalis eius filia quondam Tebaldi et Uvilielmus filius presicti Uvilielmi et Ote, et Oto filius item Otonis, seu Petrus filius Roberti, atque coniunx eius Ermengarda filia predicti Tebaldi et Tezo filius iamdicti Petri et Ermengarde conceded their rights over the church of Santo Stefano di Allein.

By his second marriage with Otta di Aglié, William was the father of his successor Rainier. He had two children by his first marriage, but their fate is unknown.

Sources
Caravale, Mario (ed). Dizionario Biografico degli Italiani: LX Grosso – Guglielmo da Forlì. Rome, 2003.
Marchesi di Monferrato: Guglielmo IV.

1030s births
1100 deaths
Marquesses of Montferrat
11th-century Italian nobility
Aleramici
Year of birth uncertain